A Touch of Love may refer to:

 A Touch of Love (1915 film), an American silent short drama directed by Tom Ricketts
 A Touch of Love (1969 film), a British drama directed by Waris Hussein
 "A Touch of Love", a song by Cleopatra from Comin' Atcha!